Hironaka (written 弘中 or 広中) is a Japanese surname. Notable people with the surname include:

Ayaka Hironaka (born 1991), Japanese TV announcer
Heisuke Hironaka (born 1931), Japanese mathematician
Kuniyoshi Hironaka (born 1976), Japanese martial artist
Wakako Hironaka (born 1934), Japanese writer and politician

Japanese-language surnames